Eversmann's redstart (Phoenicurus erythronotus), also known as the rufous-backed redstart, is a passerine bird belonging to the genus Phoenicurus. It was formerly classified in the thrush family Turdidae but is now placed in the Old World flycatcher family Muscicapidae. It was described by the German biologist Eduard Friedrich Eversmann who is commemorated in the bird's English name.

It is one of the larger redstarts, 15 to 16 cm long with a wingspan of 25.5 to 27 cm. The bill and legs are black. The male in breeding plumage has a black mask and grey crown and nape. The back and rump are rufous and the tail is also rufous apart from the darker central feathers. The wings are dark with white patches on the scapulars and primary-coverts. The underparts are mainly rufous with white on the belly and undertail-coverts.

Non-breeding and first-winter males are similar but much duller and browner. Females are mostly grey-brown. They have a rufous tail with a dark centre, a pale eye-ring, two buff wingbars and buff edges to the tertials.

The song is loud and lively. The birds also have a soft, croaking call and a whistling call. The tail is often flicked up and down.

It breeds in the mountains of Central Asia and southern Siberia from the Tien Shan range to the Tarbagatay and Altay Mountains and near Lake Baikal. Some birds move downhill for the winter while others, especially in the north-east of the range, migrate longer distances. The wintering range extends from southern Iraq through Iran and Pakistan to the western Himalayas of Kashmir. A few birds reach eastern Arabia. It has occurred as a vagrant in the State of Israel and Turkey.

It inhabits forest and woodland during the breeding season, reaching 5400 metres above sea-level. In winter it is seen in more open and arid habitats. Insects form the bulk of its diet during the breeding season but fruit and seeds are important in winter.

References

 Hollom, P. A. D.; Porter, R. F.; Christensen, S. & Willis, Ian (1988) Birds of the Middle East and North Africa, T & AD Poyser, Calton, England.
 MacKinnon, John & Phillipps, Karen (2000) A Field Guide to the Birds of China, Oxford University Press, Oxford
 Snow, D. W. & Perrins, C. M. (1998) Birds of the Western Palearctic: Concise Edition, Vol. 2, Oxford University Press, Oxford.

External links

Oriental Bird Images: Rufous-backed redstart 
Rufous-backed Redstart

Eversmann's redstart
Birds of Central Asia
Birds of Mongolia
Birds of South Asia
Birds of Western Asia
Eversmann's redstart